The UK Rock & Metal Singles Chart is a record chart which ranks the best-selling rock and heavy metal songs in the United Kingdom. Compiled and published by the Official Charts Company, the data is based on each track's weekly physical sales, digital downloads and streams. In 1995, there were 25 singles that topped the 52 published charts. The first number-one single of the year was Van Halen's "Don't Tell Me (What Love Can Do)", which spent the first seven weeks of the year at number one. The final number-one single of the year was "When Love & Hate Collide" by Def Leppard, which spent the last two weeks of the year atop the chart.

The most successful songs on the UK Rock & Metal Singles Chart in 1995 was Van Halen's "Don't Tell Me (What Love Can Do)", which spent seven weeks at number one. The band also spent two weeks at number one with "Can't Stop Lovin' You". Def Leppard's "When Love & Hate Collide" spent six weeks at number one, Bon Jovi were number one for five weeks with "This Ain't a Love Song" (five weeks) and "Something for the Pain", Whale's "Hobo Humpin' Slobo Babe" was number one for four weeks, and Therapy? spent a total of four weeks at number one with three singles. The Offspring's "Gotta Get Away" was number one for three weeks, Faith No More spent three weeks at number one with three different songs, and songs by Terrorvision, Gun, The Wildhearts and Ugly Kid Joe were number one for two weeks each.

Chart history

See also
1995 in British music
List of UK Rock & Metal Albums Chart number ones of 1995

References

External links
Official UK Rock & Metal Singles Chart Top 40 at the Official Charts Company
The Official UK Top 40 Rock Singles at BBC Radio 1

1995 in British music
United Kingdom Rock and Metal Singles
1995